VEF I-17 was a Latvian trainer aircraft (intended also as a fighter) designed in 1939 by Kārlis Irbītis. The I-17 was test flown in early 1940 and almost immediately accepted by Latvian Air Force. It was produced by the VEF factory in Riga.

Design and development
In 1939 Latvia ordered 39 Hawker Hurricane fighters from United Kingdom thus there was a need for monoplane pilots in Latvia. For this purpose Kārlis Irbītis designed the VEF I-17 among other trainer aircraft. Due to the start of Second World War in September 1939, the British Hawker Hurricanes never arrived in Latvia and this was an inducement for the Latvian Air force to encourage Latvian aircraft development instead. Due to the pressures of the war, the I-17 prototype was accepted almost without testing and serial production was started.

Six examples of the I-17 were built and there was an order for another six, but that was halted by the Soviet occupation of Latvia in June 1940.

After the occupation, the I-17 was tested by Soviet Red Army and some had Soviet M-11 engines installed. After the occupation of Latvia by Nazi Germany in July 1941, the I-17 was also examined and tested by the Luftwaffe and, like the VEF I-16, was used by the aviation school in Torun.

The further fate of the VEF I-17s produced is unknown.

Specifications (I-17)

References 

1930s Latvian military trainer aircraft
Low-wing aircraft
Single-engined tractor aircraft
VEF aircraft